Richard Martin Stern (March 17, 1915 in Fresno, California – October 31, 2001 in Santa Fe, New Mexico) was an American novelist. Stern began his writing career in the 1950s with mystery tales of private investigators, winning a 1959 Edgar Award for Best First Novel, for The Bright Road to Fear.

He was most notable for his 1973 novel The Tower, in which a fire engulfs a new metal-and-glass frame skyrise. Stern was inspired to write the novel by the construction of the World Trade Center in New York City. Warner Brothers bought the rights to the novel shortly after its publication for roughly $400,000, and Stern's book, in combination with the novel The Glass Inferno by Thomas N. Scortia and Frank M. Robinson, was the basis for the movie The Towering Inferno, directed by Irwin Allen and John Guillermin and featuring an all-star cast. With an fourteen million dollar budget, the film went on to earn over a hundred million at the American box office.

Stern was known mainly for his mysteries and disaster-related suspense. He died on October 31, 2001 after prolonged illness. He was 86.

Bibliography

Johnny Ortiz Mysteries
 Murder in the Walls (1971)
 You Don't Need an Enemy (1972)
 Death in the Snow (1973)
 Tangled Murders (1989)
 Missing Man (1990)
 Interloper (1990)

Standalone novels
 The Bright Road to Fear (1958)
 Suspense: Four Short Novels (1959)
 The Search for Tabitha Carr (1960)
 These Unlikely Deeds (1961)
 High Hazard (1962)
 Cry Havoc (1963)
 Right Hand Opposite (1964)
 I Hide, We Seek (1965)
 The Kessler Legacy (1967)
 Merry Go Round (1969)
 Brood of Eagles (1969)
 Manuscript for Murder (1970)
 Stanfield Harvest (1972)
 The Tower (1973) (one of two books used to create the film The Towering Inferno)
 Power (1974)
 Snowbound Six (1977)
 Flood (1979)
 The Big Bridge (1982)
 Wildfire (1985)
 Tsunami (1988)

References

1915 births
2001 deaths
20th-century American novelists
American male novelists
American mystery writers
Edgar Award winners
Writers from Santa Fe, New Mexico
20th-century American male writers